Kot Fatta is a city and a municipal council in Bathinda district in the Indian state of Punjab.

The town is the second railway station on the Bathinda-Delhi railway line. It is located on the Bathinda-Mohali(SAS Nagar) State Highway (no. 12-A). It is 19 kilometres far from main city/district Bathinda. In the north is Bhucho Mandi, in south is Tawandi Sabo (Damdama Sahib) and in the east is Maur Mandi.

Demographics
As of the 2001 India census, Kot Fatta has a population of 6493. Males constitute 53% of the population and females 47%. Kot Fatta has an average literacy rate of 51%, lower than the national average of 59.5%: male literacy is 58%, and female literacy is 44%. In Kot Fatta, 14% of the population is under 6 years of age.

Overview 
Kot Fatta has a Saheed sipahi darshan singh Govt. Senior Secondary School and three primary schools. It has a railway station, a police station, a small market bazaar (ਦਾਣਾ ਮੰਡੀ), a Health Dispensary and veterinary hospital. A municipal council office is located in the grain market. A bus stand with shops on Bathinda Mansa Road. The main Jat Sikh Community are Dhillons and it is an agricultural town. Wheat, paddy, cotton potatoes are the main crops of town. It has four Gurudwara sahib's.It has a post office near to high school.

References 

Bathinda
Cities and towns in Bathinda district